Fayzulin or Faizulin is a Tatar surname that may refer to:

 Ilshat Faizulin (born 1973), Russian footballer
 Vladimir Fayzulin (born 1952), Soviet and Russian footballer and coach
 Viktor Fayzulin (born 1986), Russian footballer

Russian-language surnames
Tatar-language surnames